Henri-Georges Siqueira-Barras is a retired Brazilian-Swiss football player. Siqueira is a former youth international and was in the Swiss U-17 squad that won the 2002 U-17 European Championships.

Honours
Switzerland U-17
 UEFA U-17 European Championship: 2002

References

External links
football.ch 
AC Bellinzona profile 

1985 births
Living people
Grasshopper Club Zürich players
FC Winterthur players
Neuchâtel Xamax FCS players
FC Locarno players
AC Bellinzona players
FC Chiasso players
Enosis Neon Paralimni FC players
FC Argeș Pitești players
ACF Gloria Bistrița players
Expatriate footballers in Cyprus
Expatriate footballers in Romania
Association football central defenders
Brazilian emigrants to Switzerland
Swiss expatriate footballers
Swiss expatriate sportspeople in Cyprus
Swiss expatriate sportspeople in Romania
Swiss men's footballers
Switzerland youth international footballers
Liga I players
Cypriot First Division players
Place of birth missing (living people)